Nicholas Abercrombie (born 1944) is a British sociologist and retired academic. He was Professor of Sociology at Lancaster University from 1990 to 2004.

Education and career 
Born in Birmingham in 1944, Abercrombie's father Michael and mother Jane (née Johnson) were academics. He was educated at The Queen's College, Oxford, graduating with a BA in 1966. He then completed an MSc at the London School of Economics in 1968.

Abercrombie worked as a research officer in town planning at University College London from 1968 to 1970, when he joined Lancaster University as a lecturer. He then carried out doctoral studies there and obtained a PhD in 1980. In 1983, he was promoted to a senior lectureship and in 1988 became reader in sociology. In 1990, he was appointed Professor of Sociology at Lancaster, and in 1995 became Pro-Vice Chancellor. He retired in 2004.

Publications 

 Class, Structure, and Knowledge (Basil Blackwell, 1980).
 (Co-authored with Stephen Hill and Bryan S. Turner) The Dominant Ideology Thesis (Allen & Unwin, 1980).
 (Co-authored with John Urry) Capital, Labour, and the Middle Classes (Allen & Unwin, 1983).
 (Co-authored with Stephen Hill and Bryan S. Turner) The Penguin Dictionary of Sociology (Penguin, 1984).
 (Co-authored with Stephen Hill and Bryan S. Turner) Sovereign Individuals of Capitalism (Allen & Unwin, 1986).
 (Co-authored with Alan Warde, Keith Soothill, Rosemary Deem, Sue Penna, Andrew Sayer, John Urry and Sylvia Walby) Contemporary British Society (Polity Press, 1988; 3rd ed. 2000).
 (Edited with Stephen Hill and Bryan S. Turner) Dominant Ideologies (Unwin Hyman, 1990).
 (Edited with Russell Keat) Enterprise Culture (Routledge, 1991).
 (Edited with Alan Warde) Social Change in Contemporary Britain (Polity Press, 1992).
 (Edited with Alan Warde) Stratification and Social Inequality: Studies in British Society (Framework Press, 1994).
 (Edited with Alan Warde) Family, Household, and Life-Course: Studies in British Society (Framework Press, 1994).
 (Edited with Russell Keat and Nigel Whiteley) The Authority of the Consumer (Routledge, 1994).
 Television and Society (Polity Press, 1996).
 (With Brian Longhurst) Audiences: A Sociological Theory of Performance and Imagination (Sage, 1998).
 (Edited with Alan Warde) The Contemporary British Society Reader (Polity Press, 2000).

References 

Living people
1944 births
British sociologists
Alumni of The Queen's College, Oxford
Alumni of the London School of Economics
Alumni of Lancaster University
Academics of Lancaster University